SPARX Group is a group of companies led by SPARX Group Co., Ltd as a holding company and is active in the investment and real estate business.

Background 
SPARX Asset Management Co., Ltd was established on July 1, 1989.

On December 1, 2001, it listed on the JASDAQ.

In October 1, 2006, SPARX Asset Management Co., Ltd changed its name to SPARX Group Co., Ltd.

Apart from the holding company, the group consists of:

 SPARX Asset Management Co., Ltd.
 SPARX Green Energy & Technology Co., Ltd.
 SPARX Asset Trust & Management Co., Ltd.
 SPARX AI & Technologies Investment Co., Ltd.
 SPARX Innovation for Future Co.,Ltd.
 SPARX Asset Management Korea Co., Ltd.
 SPARX Asia Investment Advisors Limited

SPARX plans to create the Mirai Renewable Energy Fund with Toyota, which aims to invest in the construction of solar, wind, biomass and geothermal power plants.

References

External links
 SPARX Group website

Holding companies of Japan
Real estate companies based in Tokyo